Khalid Saeed Batarfi, also known as Abū al-Miqdād al-Kindī, is a Saudi Arabian militant and the current emir of Al Qaeda in the Arabian Peninsula. He oversaw the Yemen-based group's media network and led jihadist fighters in their takeover of Yemen's Abyan Governorate in 2011, where he was accorded the position of emir. He also reputedly carried out terrorist attacks in the Abyan and Hadhramaut governorates.

On 17 March 2011, Batarfi was captured by security forces in the Taiz Governorate. For four years, he was imprisoned in Mukalla. He was freed, along with about 300 other inmates, by al Qaeda fighters on 2 April 2015, during the Battle of Mukalla. The Washington Post compared the Mukalla prison break to the escape of 23 fighters, including future AQAP emir Nasir al-Wuhayshi, from a Yemeni prison in 2006, a formative event for the group.

Batarfi attracted media attention when he posed for photographs taken by al Qaeda members in the Hadhramaut governor's palace, which fighters took over.

Batarfi was promoted to leader after the death of Qasim al-Raymi in January 2020. In February 2021, the UN claimed that Batarfi was arrested during a security operation in Al Ghaydah in October 2020. However, Batarfi later appeared in a video discussing the January 6, 2021 riot at the U.S. Capitol.

The U.S. Rewards for Justice Program is offering up to $5 million in exchange for information leading to Batarfi's apprehension.

See also
List of fugitives from justice who disappeared

References

Al-Qaeda leaders
Living people
1970s births
Saudi Arabian people of Yemeni descent
Saudi Arabian al-Qaeda members
Leaders of Islamic terror groups
People from Abyan Governorate
Escapees from Yemeni detention
Fugitives
People imprisoned on charges of terrorism
Yemeni al-Qaeda members
Yemeni escapees